The 2011–12 season is the 123rd season of competitive football in Denmark.

Club football

Domestic football

Superliga

The 23rd edition of the Danish Superliga began on 13 July 2012 and ended on 20 May 2013.

First Division

2012–13 Danish 2nd Divisions

Cup

The Cup is scheduled to play its first round matches on 14–16 August 2012 and hold its final on 9 May.

Champions League

Group E

Europa League

Group E

National team football

Men's national football team

 
Seasons in Danish football